Mae Kham is a village and tambon (subdistrict) of Mae Chan District, in Chiang Rai Province, Thailand. In 2005 it had a population of 11,569 people. The tambon contains 13 villages.

References

Tambon of Chiang Rai province
Populated places in Chiang Rai province